Aryan or Arya (Indo-Iranian ) is a term originally used as an ethnocultural self-designation by Indo-Iranians in ancient times, in contrast to the nearby outsiders known as 'non-Aryan'. In Ancient India, the term ā́rya was used by the Indo-Aryan speakers of the Vedic period as an endonym (self-designation) and in reference to a region known as Āryāvarta ('abode of the Aryas'), where the Indo-Aryan culture emerged. In the Avesta scriptures, ancient Iranian peoples similarly used the term airya to designate themselves as an ethnic group, and in reference to their mythical homeland, Airyanǝm Vaēǰō ('expanse of the Aryas' or 'stretch of the Aryas'). The stem also forms the etymological source of place names such as Iran and Alania.

Although the stem  may be of Proto-Indo-European (PIE) origin, its use as an ethnocultural self-designation is only attested among Indo-Iranian peoples, and it is not known if PIE speakers had a term to designate themselves as 'Proto-Indo-Europeans'. In any case, scholars point out that, even in ancient times, the idea of being an Aryan was religious, cultural, and linguistic, not racial.

In the 1850s, the term 'Aryan' was adopted as a racial category by French writer Arthur de Gobineau, who, through the later works of Houston Stewart Chamberlain, influenced the Nazi racial ideology. Under Nazi rule (1933–1945), the term applied to most inhabitants of Germany excluding Jews, Roma, and Slavs such as Czechs, Poles or Russians. Those classified as 'non-Aryans,' especially Jews, were discriminated against before suffering the systematic mass killing known as the Holocaust. The atrocities committed in the name of Aryanist supremacist ideologies have led academics to generally avoid the term 'Aryan', which has been replaced in most cases by 'Indo-Iranian', although the South Asian branch is still known as 'Indo-Aryan'.

Etymology 

The term Arya was first rendered into a modern European language in 1771 as Aryens by French Indologist Abraham-Hyacinthe Anquetil-Duperron, who rightly compared the Greek arioi with the Avestan airya and the country name Iran. A German translation of Anquetil-Duperron's work led to the introduction of the term Arier in 1776. The Sanskrit word ā́rya is rendered as 'noble' in William Jones' 1794 translation of the Indian Laws of Manu, and the English Aryan (originally spelt Arian) appeared a few decades later, first as an adjective in 1839, then as a noun in 1851.

Indo-Iranian 
The Sanskrit word ā́rya (आर्य) was originally an ethnocultural term designating those who spoke Vedic Sanskrit and adhered to Vedic cultural norms (including religious rituals and poetry), in contrast to an outsider, or an-ā́rya ('non-Arya'). By the time of the Buddha (5th–4th century BCE), it took the meaning of 'noble'. In Old Iranian languages, the Avestan term airya (Old Persian ariya) was likewise used as an ethnocultural self-designation by ancient Iranian peoples, in contrast to an an-airya ('non-Arya'). It designated those who belonged to the 'Aryan' (Iranian) ethnic stock, spoke the language and followed the religion of the 'Aryas'.

These two terms derive from the reconstructed Proto-Indo-Iranian stem - or -, which was probably the name used by the prehistoric Indo-Iranian peoples to designate themselves as an ethnocultural group. The term did not have any racial connotation, which only emerged later in the works of 19th-century Western writers. According to David W. Anthony, "the Rigveda and Avesta agreed that the essence of their shared parental Indo-Iranian identity was linguistic and ritual, not racial. If a person sacrificed to the right gods in the right way using the correct forms of the traditional hymns and poems, that person was an Aryan."

Proto-Indo-European 
However, the proposed Anatolian, Celtic and Germanic cognates are not universally accepted. In any case, the Indo-Iranian ethnic connotation is absent from the other Indo-European languages, which rather conceived the possible cognates of - as a social status, and there is no evidence that Proto-Indo-European speakers had a term to refer to themselves as 'Proto-Indo-Europeans'.

 Early PIE: ,
 Anatolian: *ʔor-o-, 'peer, freeman',
 Hittite: arā-, 'comrade, peer, companion, friend'; arāwa-, 'free from'; arawan(n)i-, 'free, freeman (not being slave)'; natta ara, 'not proper to the community',
 Lycian: arus-, 'citizens'; arawa-, 'freedom',
 Late PIE: ,
 Indo-Iranian: , 'Aryan, Indo-Iranian',
 Old Indo-Aryan: árya-, 'Aryan, faithful to the Vedic religion'; aryá-, 'kind, favourable, true, devoted'; arí-, 'faithful; devoted person, ± kinsman';
 Iranian: , 'Aryan, Iranian',
 Avestan: airya- (pl. aire), 'Aryan, Iranian',
 Old Persian: ariya-, 'Aryan, Iranian',
 Gaulish: ario-, 'freeman, lord; foremost',
 Old Irish: aire, 'freeman, chief; noble';
 Germanic , 'noble, distinguished, esteemed',
 Old Norse: arjosteʀ, 'foremost, most distinguished'.

The term  may derive from the PIE verbal root , meaning 'to put together'. Oswald Szemerényi has also argued that the stem could be a Near-Eastern loanword from the Ugaritic ary ('kinsmen'), although J. P. Mallory and Douglas Q. Adams find this proposition "hardly compelling". According to them, the original PIE meaning had a clear emphasis on the in-group status of the "freemen" as distinguished from that of outsiders, particularly those captured and incorporated into the group as slaves. In Anatolia, the base word has come to emphasize personal relationship, whereas it took a more ethnic meaning among Indo-Iranians, presumably because most of the unfree who lived among them were captives from other ethnic groups.

Historical usage

Proto-Indo-Iranians 
Indo-Iranians (Aryas) are generally associated with the Sintashta culture (2100–1800 BCE), named after the Sintashta archaeological site in Chelyabinsk Oblast, Russia. Linguistic evidence show that Proto-Indo-Iranian (Proto-Aryan) speakers dwelled in the Eurasian steppe, south of early Uralic tribes; the stem - was notably borrowed into the Pre-Saami language as *orja-, at the origin of oarji ('southwest') and årjel ('Southerner'). The loanword took the meaning 'slave' in other Finno-Permic languages, suggesting conflictual relations between Indo-Iranian and Uralic peoples in prehistoric times.

The stem is also found in the Indo-Iranian god , translated as 'Arya-spirited', 'Aryanness', or 'Aryanhood'; he was known in Vedic Sanskrit as Aryaman and in Avestan as Airyaman. The deity was in charge of welfare and the community, and connected with the institution of marriage. Through marital ceremonies, one of the functions of Aryaman was to assimilate women from other tribes to the host community. If the Irish heroes Érimón and Airem and the Gaulish personal name Ariomanus are also cognates (i.e. linguistic siblings sharing a common origin), a deity of Proto-Indo-European origin named  may also be posited.

Ancient India 

Vedic Sanskrit speakers viewed the term ā́rya as a religious–linguistic category, referring to those who spoke the Sanskrit language and adhered to Vedic cultural norms, especially those who worshipped the Vedic gods (Indra and Agni in particular), took part in the sacrifices and festivals, and practiced the art of poetry.

The 'non-Aryas' designated primarily those who were not able to speak the āryā language correctly, the Mleccha or Mṛdhravāc. However, āryā is used only once in the Vedas to designate the language of the texts, the Vedic area being defined in the Kauṣītaki Āraṇyaka as that where the āryā vāc ('Ārya speech') is spoken. Some 35 names of Vedic tribes, chiefs and poets mentioned in the Rigveda were of 'non-Aryan' origin, demonstrating that cultural assimilation to the ā́rya community was possible, and/or that some 'Aryan' families chose to give 'non-Aryan' names to their newborns. In the words of Indologist Michael Witzel, the term ārya "does not mean a particular people or even a particular 'racial' group but all those who had joined the tribes speaking Vedic Sanskrit and adhering to their cultural norms (such as ritual, poetry, etc.)".

In later Indian texts and Buddhist sources, ā́rya took the meaning of 'noble', such as in the terms Āryadésa- ('noble land') for India, Ārya-bhāṣā- ('noble language') for Sanskrit, or āryaka- ('honoured man'), which gave the Pali ayyaka- ('grandfather'). The term came to incorporate the idea of a high social status, but was also used as an honorific for the Brahmana or the Buddhist monks. Parallelly, the Mleccha acquired additional meanings that referred to people of lower castes or aliens.

Ancient Iran 
In the words of scholar Gherardo Gnoli, the Old Iranian airya (Avestan) and ariya (Old Persian) were collective terms denoting the "peoples who were aware of belonging to the one ethnic stock, speaking a common language, and having a religious tradition that centred on the cult of Ahura Mazdā", in contrast to the 'non-Aryas', who are called anairya in Avestan, anaryān in Parthian, and anērān in Middle Persian.

By the late 6th–early 5th century BCE, the Achaemenid king Darius the Great and his son Xerxes I described themselves as ariya ('Arya') and ariya čiça ('of Aryan origin'). In the Behistun inscription, authored by Darius during his reign (522 – 486 BCE), the Old Persian language is called ariya, and the Elamite version of the inscription portrays the Zoroastrian deity Ahura Mazdā as the "god of the Aryas" (ura-masda naap harriia-naum). In the sacred Avesta scriptures, the stem can also be found in poetic expressions such as the 'glory of the Aryas' (airyanąm xᵛarənō ), the 'most swift-arrowed of the Aryas' (xšviwi išvatəmō airyanąm), associated with the mythical archer Ǝrəxša, or the 'hero of the Aryas' (arša airyanąm), attached to Kavi Haosravō.

The self-identifier was inherited in ethnic names such as the Parthian Ary (pl. Aryān), the Middle Persian Ēr (pl. Ēran), or the New Persian Irāni (pl. Irāniyān). Iron), spelled Irä or Erä in the Digorian dialect. The Rabatak inscription, written in the Bactrian language in the 2nd century CE, likewise uses the term ariao for 'Iranian'.

The name Arizantoi, listed by Greek historian Herodotus as one of the six tribes composing the Iranian Medes, is derived from the Old Iranian - ('having Aryan lineage'). Herodotus also mentions that the Medes once called themselves Arioi, and Strabo locates the land of Arianē between Persia and India. Other occurrences include the Greek áreion (Damascius), Arianoi (Diodorus Siculus) and arian (pl. arianōn; Sasanian period), as well as the Armenian expression ari (Agathangelos), meaning 'Iranian'.

Until the demise of the Parthian Empire (247 BCE–224 CE), the Iranian identity was essentially defined as cultural and religious. Following conflicts between Manichean universalism and Zoroastrian nationalism during the 3rd century CE, however, traditionalistic and nationalistic movements eventually took the upper hand during the Sasanian period, and the Iranian identity (ērīh) came to assume a definite political value. Among Iranians (ērān), one ethnic group in particular, the Persians, were placed at the centre of the Ērān-šahr ('Kingdom of the Iranians') ruled by the šāhān-šāh ērān ud anērān ('King of Kings of the Iranians and non-Iranians').

Ethical and ethnic meanings may also intertwine, for instance in the use of anēr ('non-Iranian') as a synonymous of 'evil' in anērīh ī hrōmāyīkān ("the evil conduct of the Romans, i.e. Byzantines"), or in the association of ēr ('Iranian') with good birth (hutōhmaktom ēr martōm, 'the best-born Arya man') and the use of ērīh ('Iranianness') to mean 'nobility' against "labor and burdens from poverty" in the 10th-century Dēnkard. The Indian opposition between ārya- ('noble') and dāsá- ('stranger, slave, enemy') is however absent from the Iranian tradition. According to linguist Émile Benveniste, the root  may have been used exclusively as a collective name by Iranian peoples: "If the word referred at first to Iranian society, the name by which this enemy people called themselves collectively took on a hostile connotation and became for the Aryas of India the term for an inferior and barbarous people."

Place names 
In ancient Sanskrit literature, the term Āryāvarta (आर्यावर्त, the 'abode of the Aryas') was the name given to the cradle of the Indo-Aryan culture in northern India. The Manusmṛiti locates Āryāvarta in "the tract between the Himalaya and the Vindhya ranges, from the Eastern (Bay of Bengal) to the Western Sea (Arabian Sea)".

The stem airya- also appears in Airyanəm Waēǰō (the 'stretch of the Aryas' or the 'Aryan plain'), which is described in the Avesta as the mythical homeland of the early Iranians, said to have been created as "the first and best of places and habitations" by the god Ahura Mazdā. The Sasanian Empire, officially named Ērān-šahr ('Kingdom of the Iranians'; from Old Persian ), could also be referred to by the abbreviated form Ērān, as distinguished from the Roman West known as Anērān. The western variant Īrān, abbreviated from Īrān-šahr, is at the origin of the English country name Iran.

Alania, the name of the medieval kingdom of the Alans, derives from a dialectal variant of the Old Iranian stem , which is also linked to the mythical Airyanem Waēǰō. Besides the ala- development, - may have turned into the stem ir-y- via an i-mutation in modern Ossetian languages, as in the place name Iryston (Ossetia), here attached to the Iranian suffix .

Other place names mentioned in the Avesta include airyō šayana, a movable term corresponding to the 'territory of the Aryas', airyanąm dahyunąm, the 'lands of the Aryas', Airyō-xšuθa, a mountain in eastern Iran associated with Ǝrəxša, and vīspe aire razuraya, the forest where Kavi Haosravō slew the god Vāyu.

Personal names 

Old Persian names derived the stem - include Aryabignes ('Gift of the Aryans'), Ariarathes ('having Aryan joy'), Ariobarzanēs (-, 'exalting the Aryans'), Ariaios (probably used as a hypocorism of the precedent names), or Ariyāramna (whose meaning remains unclear). The English Alan and the French Alain (from Latin Alanus) may have been introduced by Alan settlers to Western Europe during the first millennium CE.

The name Aryan (including derivatives such as Aaryan, Arya, Ariyan or Aria) is still used as a given name or surname in modern South Asia and Iran. There has also been a rise in names associated with Aryan in the West, which have been popularized due to pop culture. According to the U.S. Social Security Administration in 2012, Arya was the fastest-rising girl's name in popularity in the U.S., jumping from 711th to 413th position. The name entered the top 200 most commonly used names for baby girls born in England and Wales in 2017.

In Latin literature 
The word Arianus was used to designate Ariana, the area comprising Afghanistan, Iran, North-western India and Pakistan. In 1601, Philemon Holland used 'Arianes' in his translation of the Latin Arianus to designate the inhabitants of Ariana. This was the first use of the form Arian verbatim in the English language.

Modern Persian nationalism
In the aftermath of the Islamic conquest in Iran, racialist rhetoric became a literary idiom during the 7th century, i.e., when the Arabs became the primary "Other" – the Aniran – and the antithesis of everything Iranian (i.e. Aryan) and Zoroastrian. But "the antecedents of [present-day] Iranian ultra-nationalism can be traced back to the writings of late nineteenth-century figures such as Mirza Fatali Akhundov and Mirza Aqa Khan Kermani. Demonstrating affinity with Orientalist views of the supremacy of the Aryan peoples and the mediocrity of the Semitic peoples, Iranian nationalist discourse idealized pre-Islamic Achaemenid and Sassanid empires, whilst negating the 'Islamization' of Persia by Muslim forces." In the 20th century, different aspects of this idealization of a distant past would be instrumentalized by both the Pahlavi monarchy (In 1967, Iran's Pahlavi dynasty [overthrown in the 1979 Iranian Revolution] added the title Āryāmehr Light of the Aryans to the other styles of the Iranian monarch, the Shah of Iran being already known at that time as the Shahanshah (King of Kings)), and by the Islamic republic that followed it; the Pahlavis used it as a foundation for anticlerical monarchism, and the clerics used it to exalt Iranian values vis-á-vis westernization.

Modern religious use 
The word ārya is often found in Hindu, Buddhist, and Jain texts. In the Indian spiritual context, it can be applied to Rishis or to someone who has mastered the four noble truths and entered upon the spiritual path. According to Indian leader Jawaharlal Nehru, the religions of India may be called collectively ārya dharma, a term that includes the religions that originated in the Indian subcontinent (e.g. Hinduism, Buddhism, Jainism and Sikhism).

The word ārya is also often used in Jainism, in Jain texts such as the Pannavanasutta. In Avaśyakaniryukti, an early Jaina text, a character named Ārya Mangu is mentioned twice.

Scholarship

19th and early 20th century 
The term 'Aryan' was initially introduced into the English language through works of comparative philology, as a modern rendering of the Sanskrit word ā́rya. First translated as 'noble' in William Jones' 1794 translation of the Laws of Manu, early-19th-century scholars later noticed that the term was used in the earliest Vedas as an ethnocultural self-designation "comprising the worshipers of the gods of the Brahmans". This interpretation was simultaneously influenced by the presence of the word Ἀριάνης (Ancient Greek) ~ Arianes (Latin) in classical texts, which had been rightly compared by Anquetil-Duperron in 1771 to the Iranian airya (Avestan) ~ ariya (Old Persian), a self-identifier used by the speakers of Iranian languages since ancient times. Accordingly, the term 'Aryan' came to refer in scholarship to the Indo-Iranian languages, and, by extension, to the native speakers of the Proto-Indo-Iranian language, the prehistoric Indo-Iranian peoples.

During the 19th century, through the works of Friedrich Schlegel (1772–1829), Christian Lassen (1800–1876), Adolphe Pictet (1799–1875), and Max Müller (1823–1900), the terms Aryans, Arier, and Aryens came to be adopted by a number of Western scholars as a synonym of '(Proto-)Indo-Europeans'. Many of them indeed believed that Aryan was also the original self-designation used by the prehistoric speakers of the Proto-Indo-European language, based on the erroneous assumptions that Sanskrit was the oldest Indo-European language and on the linguistically untenable position that Ériu (Ireland) was related to Arya. This hypothesis has since been abandoned in scholarship due to the lack of evidence for the use of arya as an ethnocultural self-designation outside the Indo-Iranian world.

Contemporary scholarship 
In contemporary scholarship, the terms 'Aryan' and 'Proto-Aryan' are still sometimes used to designate the prehistoric Indo-Iranian peoples and their proto-language. However, the use of 'Aryan' to mean 'Proto-Indo-European' is now regarded as an "aberration to be avoided". The 'Indo-Iranian' subfamily of languages – which encompasses the Indo-Aryan, Iranian, and Nuristani branches – may also be referred to as the 'Aryan languages'.

However, the atrocities committed in the name of Aryanist racial ideologies during the first part of the 20th century have led academics to generally avoid the term 'Aryan', which has been replaced in most cases by 'Indo-Iranian', although its Indic branch is still called 'Indo-Aryan'. The name 'Iranian', which stems from the Old Persian , also continues to be used to refer to specific ethnolinguistic groups.
 Indo-Aryan refers to the populations speaking an Indo-Aryan language or identifying as Indo-Aryan; they form the predominant group in Northern India. The largest Indo-Aryan ethnolinguistic groups are Hindi–Urdu, Bengali, Punjabi, Marathi, Gujarati, Rajasthani, Bhojpuri, Maithili, Odia, and Sindhi. More than 900 million people are native speakers of an Indo-Aryan language.
 Iranian (or Iranic) is used to designate the speakers of Iranian languages or the peoples who identify as "Iranians", especially in Greater Iran. Modern Iranian ethnolinguistic groups include Persians, Pashtuns, Kurds, Tajiks, Balochs, Lurs, Pamiris, Zazas, and Ossetians. An estimated 150 to 200 million people are native speakers of an Iranian language.
Some authors writing for popular consumption have kept on using the word "Aryan" for all Indo-Europeans in the tradition of H. G. Wells, such as the science fiction author Poul Anderson, and scientists writing for the popular media, such as Colin Renfrew. According to F. B. J. Kuiper, echoes of "the 19th century prejudice about 'northern' Aryans who were confronted on Indian soil with black barbarians [...] can still be heard in some modern studies."

Aryanism and racism

Invention of the "Aryan race"

Origin 
Racially-oriented interpretations of the Vedic Aryas as "fair-skinned foreign invaders" coming from the North led to the adoption of the term Aryan in the West as a racial category connected to a supremacist ideology known as Aryanism, which conceived the Aryan race as the "superior race" responsible for most of the achievements of ancient civilizations. In 1888 Max Müller, who had himself inaugurated the racial interpretations of the Rigveda, denounced talk of an "Aryan race, Aryan blood, Aryan eyes and hair" as a nonsense comparable to a linguist speaking of "a dolichocephalic dictionary or a brachycephalic grammar". But an increasing number of Western writers, especially anthropologists and non-specialists influenced by Darwinist theories, came to see the Aryans as a "physical-genetic species" contrasting with the other human races - rather than as an ethnolinguistic category. During the late-19th and early-20th centuries, a fusion of Aryanism with Nordicism - promoted by writers such as Arthur de Gobineau (1816-1882), Theodor Poesche (1825-1899), Houston Chamberlain (1855-1927), Paul Broca (1824-1880), Karl Penka (1847-1912), and Hans Günther (1891-1968) - led to the portrayal of the Proto-Indo-Europeans as blond and tall, with blue eyes and dolichocephalic skulls. Modern scholars reject those views and remind that the idea of a Vedic opposition between ārya and dāsa underlying a racial division remains problematic, since "most of the [Vedic] passages may not refer to dark or light skinned people, but dark and light worlds".

Theories of racial supremacy 

Arthur de Gobineau, the author of the influential Essay on the Inequality of the Human Races (1853), viewed the white or Aryan race as the only civilized one, and conceived cultural decline and miscegenation as intimately intertwined. According to him, northern Europeans had migrated across the world and founded the major civilizations, before being diluted through racial mixing with indigenous populations described as racially inferior, leading to the progressive decay of the ancient Aryan civilizations. In 1878, German American anthropologist Theodor Poesche published a survey of historical references attempting to demonstrate that the Aryans were light-skinned blue-eyed blonds. The use of Arier to mean 'non-Jewish' seems to have first occurred in 1887, when a Viennese physical-fitness society decided to allow as members only "Germans of Aryan descent" (Deutsche arischer Abkunft). In The Foundations of the Nineteenth Century (1899), which Stefan Arvidsson notes is identified as "one of the most important proto-Nazi texts",
British-German writer Houston Chamberlain theorized an existential struggle to the death between a superior German-Aryan race and a destructive Jewish-Semitic race. The best-seller The Passing of the Great Race, published by American writer Madison Grant in 1916, warns of a danger of miscegenation with the immigrant "inferior races" – including speakers of Indo-European languages (such as Slavs, Italians, and Yiddish-speaking Jews) – allegedly faced by the "racially superior" Germanic Aryans (that is: Americans of English, German, and Scandinavian descent).

Led by Guido von List (1848–1919) and Jörg Lanz von Liebenfels (1874–1954), Ariosophists founded an ideological system combining Völkisch nationalism with esoterism. Prophesying a coming era of German (Aryan) world rule, they argued that a conspiracy against Germans – said to have been instigated by the non-Aryan races, by the Jews, or by the early Church – had "sought to ruin this ideal Germanic world by emancipating the non-German inferiors in the name of a spurious egalitarianism".

North European hypothesis 

In the meantime, the idea that Indo-European languages had originated from South Asia gradually lost support among academics. After the end of the 1860s, alternative models of Indo-European migrations began to emerge, some of them locating the ancestral homeland in Northern Europe. Karl Penka, credited as "a transitional figure between Aryanism and Nordicism", argued in 1883 that the Aryans originated in southern Scandinavia. In the early-20th century, German scholar Gustaf Kossinna (1858-1931), attempting to connect a prehistoric material culture with the reconstructed Proto-Indo-European language, contended on archaeological grounds that the 'Indo-Germanic' (Indogermanische) migrations originated from a homeland located in northern Europe. Until the end of World War II, scholarship on the Indo-European Urheimat broadly fell into two camps: Kossinna's followers and those, initially led by Otto Schrader (1855-1919), who supported a steppe homeland in Eurasia, which became the most widespread hypothesis among scholars.

British Raj
In India, the British colonial government had followed de Gobineau's arguments along another line, and had fostered the idea of a superior "Aryan race" that co-opted the Indian caste system in favor of imperial interests. In its fully developed form, the British-mediated interpretation foresaw a segregation of Aryan and non-Aryan along the lines of caste, with the upper castes being "Aryan" and the lower ones being "non-Aryan". The European developments not only allowed the British to identify themselves as high-caste, but also allowed the Brahmins to view themselves as on-par with the British. Further, it provoked the reinterpretation of Indian history in racialist and, in opposition, Indian Nationalist terms.

Nazism and white supremacy 

Through the works of Houston Stewart Chamberlain, Gobineau's ideas influenced the Nazi racial ideology, which saw the "Aryan race" as innately superior to other putative racial groups. The Nazi official Alfred Rosenberg argued for a new "religion of the blood" based on the supposed innate promptings of the Nordic soul to defend its "noble" character against racial and cultural degeneration. Rosenberg believed the Nordic race to be descended from Proto-Aryans, a hypothetical prehistoric people who dwelt on the North German Plain and who had ultimately originated from the lost continent of Atlantis. Under Rosenberg, the theories of Arthur de Gobineau, Georges Vacher de Lapouge, Blavatsky, Houston Stewart Chamberlain, Madison Grant, and those of Hitler, all culminated in Nazi Germany's race policies and the "Aryanization" decrees of the 1920s, 1930s, and early 1940s. In its "appalling medical model", the annihilation of the "racially inferior" Untermenschen was sanctified as the excision of a diseased organ in an otherwise healthy body, which led to the Holocaust.According to Nazi racial theorists, the term "Aryans" (Arier) described the Germanic peoples, and they considered the purest Aryans to be those that belonged to a "Nordic race" physical ideal, which they referred to as the "master race". However, a satisfactory definition of "Aryan" remained problematic during Nazi Germany. Although the physical ideal of Nazi racial theorists was typically the tall, blond haired, and light-eyed Nordic individual, such theorists accepted the fact that a considerable variety of hair and eye colour existed within the racial categories they recognised. For example, Adolf Hitler and many Nazi officials had dark hair and were still considered members of the Aryan race under Nazi racial doctrine, because the determination of an individual's racial type depended on a preponderance of many characteristics in an individual rather than on just one defining feature. In September 1935, the Nazis passed the Nuremberg Laws. All Aryan Reich citizens were required to prove their Aryan ancestry; one way was to obtain an Ahnenpass ("ancestor pass") by providing proof through baptismal certificates that all four grandparents were of Aryan descent. In December of the same year, the Nazis founded Lebensborn ("Fount of Life") to counteract the falling Aryan birth rates in Germany, and to promote Nazi eugenics.

Many American white supremacist neo-Nazi groups and prison gangs refer to themselves as 'Aryans', including the Aryan Brotherhood, the Aryan Nations, the Aryan Republican Army, the White Aryan Resistance, or the Aryan Circle. Modern nationalist political groups and neo-Pagan movements in Russia claim a direct linkage between themselves as Slavs and the ancient 'Aryans', and in some Indian nationalist circles, the term 'Aryan' can also be used in reference to an alleged Aryan 'race'.

"Aryan invasion theory" 

Translating the sacred Indian texts of the Rig Veda in the 1840s, German linguist Friedrich Max Muller found what he believed was evidence of an ancient invasion of India by Hindu Brahmins, a group which he called "the Arya." In his later works, Muller was careful to note that he thought that Aryan was a linguistic rather than a racial category. Nevertheless, scholars used Muller's invasion theory to propose their own visions of racial conquest through South Asia and the Indian Ocean. In 1885, the New Zealand polymath Edward Tregear argued that an "Aryan tidal-wave" had washed over India and continued to push south, through the islands of the East Indian archipelago, reaching the distant shores of New Zealand. Scholars such as John Batchelor, Armand de Quatrefages, and Daniel Brinton extended this invasion theory to the Philippines, Hawaii, and Japan, identifying indigenous peoples who they believed were the descendants of early Aryan conquerors. With the discovery of the Indus Valley civilisation, mid-20th century archeologist Mortimer Wheeler argued that the large urban civilisation had been destroyed by the Aryans. This position was later discredited, with climate aridification becoming the likely cause of the collapse of the Indus Valley Civilisation. The term "invasion", while it was once commonly used in regard to Indo-Aryan migration, is now usually used only by opponents of the Indo-Aryan migration theory. The term "invasion" does not any longer reflect the scholarly understanding of the Indo-Aryan migrations, and is now generally regarded as polemical, distracting and unscholarly.

In recent decades, the idea of an Aryan migration into India has been disputed mainly by Indian scholars, who claim various alternate Indigenous Aryans scenarios contrary to established Kurgan model. However, these alternate scenarios are rooted in traditional and religious views on Indian history and identity and are universally rejected in mainstream scholarship. According to Michael Witzel, the "indigenous Aryans" position is not scholarship in the usual sense, but an "apologetic, ultimately religious undertaking". A number of other alternative theories have been proposed including Anatolian hypothesis, Armenian hypothesis, the Paleolithic continuity theory but these are not widely accepted and have received little or no interest in mainstream scholarship.

See also 
 Arya (name)
 Airyanem Vaejah
 Arya Samaj
 Graeco-Aryan
 Yamnaya culture

Notes

References

Bibliography

Further reading

 
 
 
 
 
 
 

Etymologies
Esoteric anthropogenesis
Ancient peoples
Indo-Iranian peoples
History of Iran
History of India
Avesta
Vedas
Indo-European linguistics